Frankie Bones (real name Frank Mitchell; born 1966) is an American disc jockey and house and techno music producer from Brooklyn, New York City. He is considered to be the "Godfather of American rave culture" and influential in spreading the idea of Peace, Love, Unity and Respect (PLUR) as a part of that culture.

Early life 

As a child growing up in Brooklyn, Frankie 'Bones' Mitchell's father was murdered just before Frankie graduated high school. His life radically changed, and he inherited his father's entire vinyl record collection. He began to produce house tracks with Lenny Dee.

His brother, Adam "X" Mitchell, is also a techno DJ and producer, and their colleague Heather Heart is a DJ and music writer/zine maker who helped create the community for underground techno music in New York and beyond.  Bones, Adam X, Heather Heart and others are associated with the record label Sonic Groove. The three co-owned a record store with the same name at 41 Carmine St in New York City, where it had relocated to from a Brooklyn location in 1995. The shop closed in 2004.

Bringing rave culture to America 

After he had begun producing records, Bones was offered a gig to play for 5,000 people in England called "Energy". As the event started on August 26, 1989, he played to the unexpected number of 25,000 people.
 
Together with his brother, Adam "X" Mitchell, Bones took to forming his own event in Brooklyn in the form of a series of ″Storm Rave″ events that started on May 11, 1991. The events began with only a few hundred people in attendance growing to over thousands where the likes of Josh Wink, Doc Martin, Sven Väth, The Horrorist, DJ Keoki and Richie Hawtin were able to launch their performances into international careers.
 	
Bones is recognized to have spread the idea of Peace, Love, Unity and Respect (PLUR) into rave culture. Supposedly in response to a fight that broke out at one of his Storm Raves in Brooklyn in June 1993, Bones is said to have got on the microphone and yelled: "If you don't start showing some peace, love, and unity, I'll break your faces." Other sources report that as early as "on July 4, 1990, [...] Frankie's brother and Storm Rave collaborator Adam X painted 'Peace Love Unity' on a train car". 
 	
Berlin's Love Parade, which had been generally considered to have been the largest rave festival in the world at the time, named its 1991 and 1992 parades after well-known compositions by Frankie Bones: "The Future is Ours" in 1991, and "My House is Your House (And Your House is Mine)" in 1992.

Discography

Singles
 B2B (12") – ESP-SUN Records
 Dirty Job (12") – X-Sight Records
 High I.Q. (2x10") – Hyperspace
 In The Socket (12") – ESP-SUN Records
 The Candle EP (12") – High Octane Recordings
 The Mutha Fuckin Good Life (12") – Underground Construction
 The Way U Like It (12") – Bellboy Records
 We Call It Tekkno (12") – Bash Again!
 Baseball Fury (12") – Sonic Groove
 Masters Of The Hardgroove (12") – Hard To Swallow
 My House Is Your House (12") – Bash Again!
 Electrophonic (12") – E Series
 Filthy Dirty Animal Crackers (12") – Blueline Music
 Remains 10 (12") – Remains
 The Falcon Has Landed (12") – Hard To Swallow
 The US Ghetto Selecta (12") – Pro-Jex
 Speedometer EP (12") – Synchronicity Recordings
 Dangerous on the Dancefloor - Musto and Bones

12" Vinyl Releases 
 Bonesbreaks Volume 1 (LP) Underworld Records 1988 
 Bonesbreaks Volume 2 (LP) Underworld Records 1988 
 Bonesbreaks Volume 3 (LP) Underworld Records 1989 
 Call It Techno (12") Breaking Bones Records 1989 
 New Grooves EP (12") Nugroove Records 1989 
 Bonesbreaks Volume 4 (12") Breaking Bones Records 1990 
 Bonesbreaks Volume 5 (12") Underworld Records 1990 
 Call It Techno (12") JEP Records 1990 
 Call It Techno (Remixes) (12") X Records (US) 1990 
 Cross Bones E.P. (12") Rave Age Records 1991 
 Crossbones E.P. (12") Fabulous Music UK 1991 
 Bonesbreaks Volume 6 (12") Groove World 1992 
 Trapezoid (12") Fabulous Music UK 1992 
 Bonesbreaks 7 (Progressive Vibe EP) (12") Groove World 1993 
 Bonesbreaks Volume 8 (Progressive Aggressive Freestyle EP) (12") Groove World 1993 
 From Brooklyn With Love EP (12") Groove World 1993 
 The Thunderground EP (12") Groove World 1993 
 Thunderground E.P. (12") Fabulous Music UK 1993 
 We Can Do This (12") Groove World 1993 
 We Can Do This / Feel The Rush (Test Pressing) (12") Groove World 1993 
 Bonesbreaks Volume 10 (12") Brooklyn Gutter Culture 1994 
 The 2 Clues EP (12") Empire State Records 1994 
 Bone Up! (LP) Trax Records 1995 
 Bonesbreaks – The Unreleased Project (12") Music Station 1995 
 Bonesbreaks Volume 10 (12") Hot Associated Label 1995 
 Einstein e=me+3² (12") Drop Bass Network 1995 
 Inside The Silverbox EP (12") Electric Music Foundation 1995 
 Bonesbreaks Volume 11 (LP) Underworld Records 1996 
 Climax Control (12") Hyperspace 1996 
 Furthur (12") Drop Bass Network, Communique Records 1996 
 My Peak (Promo) (12") Logic Records (US), Logic Records (US) 1996 
 Rewind Tomorrow E.P. (12") Futurist 1996 
 Technolo-G (12") ESP-SUN Records 1996 
 Trackwerk Orange 1 (12") D-Dance 1996 
 B2B (12") ESP-SUN Records 1997 
 Ghetto Technics 1 (12") Ghetto Technics 1997 
 Ghetto Technics 2 (12") Ghetto Technics 1997 
 Inside Mr. Paul's Greybox (12") Futurist 1997 
 Proceed With Caution EP (12") Electric Music Foundation 1997 
 Dirty Job (12") X-Sight Records 1998 
 Ghetto Technics 5 (12") Ghetto Technics 1998 
 Ghetto Technics 7 (12") Ghetto Technics 1998 
 Ghetto Technics 8 (12") Ghetto Technics 1998 
 High I.Q. (2x10") Hyperspace 1998 
 In The Socket (12") ESP-SUN Records 1998 
 Rockaway Shuttle EP (12") Sonic Groove 1998 
 The Candle EP (12") High Octane Recordings 1998 
 Ghetto Technics 10 (12") Ghetto Technics 1999 
 Ghetto Technics 11 (12") Ghetto Technics 1999 
 Ghetto Technics 9 (12") Ghetto Technics 1999 
 The Mutha Fuckin Good Life (12") Underground Construction 1999 
 The Way U Like It (12") Bellboy Records 1999 
 We Call It Tekkno (12") Bash Again! 1999 
 America In Black & White EP (12") Bellboy Records 2000 
 Baseball Fury (12") Sonic Groove 2000 
 Bonesbreaks 2000 (12") Badmotherf#*ker 2000 
 House Special EP (12") Urban Substance Records 2000 
 My House Is Your House (12") Bash Again! 2000 
 My House Is Your House (12") Bash Again! 2000 
 The Saga EP (12") Pro-Jex 2000 
 Electrophonic (12") E Series 2001 
 Filthy Dirty Animal Crackers (12") Blueline Music 2001 
 Ghetto Technics 14 (12") Ghetto Technics 2001 
 Ghetto Technics 16 (12") Ghetto Technics 2001 
 Ring Your Alarm EP (12") Pro-Jex 2001 
 The Metropolitan EP (12") Missile Records 2001 
 The Strength To Communicate (12") Remains 2001 
 The US Ghetto Selecta (12") Pro-Jex 2001 
 Turntable Specialist #1 (12") Hard To Swallow 2001 
 And Here's Another Human Distraction (12") Remains 2002 
 The Day After The Music Stopped EP (12") Hard To Swallow 2002 
 The Lot Of People (12") Pro-Jex 2002 
 The Thin Line Between Fantasy & Reality (2xLP) Pro-Jex 2002 
 Underground Mash-Ups (12") Hard To Swallow 2003 
 (Pro)File. (Pro)Duce. E.P. (12") The Last Label 2004 
 Crash-Up On Interstate 95 (12") The Last Label 2004 
 The Lot Of People (12") Pro-Jex 2004 
 Unidentified (12") Kiddaz.fm 2004 
 Speedometer EP (12") Synchronicity Recordings 2006 
 The House of ODD (12") The Groove Shop 2006

Albums / DJ mixes
 DJ Techno Mix Vol. 1 (CD) – Beast Records
 Global House Culture Vol. 2 (CD) – ESP-SUN Records
 Computer Controlled (CD) – X-Sight Records
 Dance Madness And The Brooklyn Groove (CD) – BMG
 United DJs Of America Vol. 6 – Frankie Bones – Brooklyn, NY (CD) – Moonshine
 The Future is Ours - Musto and Bones  - Citybeat / RCA (1990)
 Army Of One (CD) – System Recordings
 Al-Naafiysh (The Soul) Prof.File 2: Frankie Bones, Turntable Specialist (CD) (BML) (USA)
 Technolo-G (CD) Roadrunner Records (USA)(1998)
 You Know My Name (CD) Moonshine Music (2000)
 Escape from Brooklyn (CD)
 Factory 303 – Frankie Bones Continuous Mix (2000)
 Diary of a Raving Lunatic (CD) 1995

References

External links
 Discography of Franke Bones at Discogs
 Frankie Bones′ artist website at SoundCloud
 Biography of Frankie Bones at "The DJ List"

1966 births
Living people
Musicians from New York City
DJs from New York City
Club DJs
American DJs
Remixers
Place of birth missing (living people)
American techno musicians
20th-century American musicians
21st-century American musicians
Electronic dance music DJs